Nayla may refer to:

Nayla Hayek, Swiss businesswoman
Nayla Al Khaja, Emirati film writer and director
Nayla Moawad (born 1940), Lebanese politician
Nayla Tamraz, Lebanese writer and academic
Nayla Tueni, Lebanese journalist and politician
Na'ila bint al-Furafisa, wife of Uthman, the third Caliph of the Islamic Empire

See also
Neyla (disambiguation)
Naila (name)

Arabic feminine given names
Bosnian feminine given names